Ruben Nicolai (born 8 May 1975) is a Dutch television presenter and comedian. He is known as one of the comedians in the television show De Lama's together with Tijl Beckand, Ruben van der Meer and Jeroen van Koningsbrugge. He has also presented many television shows, including Lego Masters and The Masked Singer.

Career 

Together with Nathan Vecht he won both the audience award and the jury award at the Cameretten cabaret festival in 2002.

Between 2004 and 2008 he formed part of the core team of comedians in the television show De Lama's, together with Ruben van der Meer, Tijl Beckand and Jeroen van Koningsbrugge. The show is a Dutch adaptation of the show Whose Line Is It Anyway?. In 2006, they won the Gouden Televizier-Ring award for the show.

In 2009, he won the Zilveren Televizier-Ster award. In 2010, he presented the television show Gehaktdag in which a Dutch celebrity was satirically critiqued by two teams. In January 2011, he switched from AVRO to work for his previous employer BNN.

In 2015, he presented the game show Vijf tegen Vijf. He presented Idols 5 (2016) and Idols 6 (2017) of the Idols television series together with Lieke van Lexmond.

Nicolai and Tijl Beckand also presented Professor Nicolai en dokter Beckand, a quiz and game show with small scientific experiments and questions about science. In the show, science journalist and presenter Diederik Jekel helps to explain the scientific concepts and experiments. Nicolai is also the presenter of the game show Beste kijkers which first aired in 2015.

Nicolai also presents the Dutch version of The Masked Singer. In 2020, Nicolai and Belgian actor and presenter Kürt Rogiers presented the television show Lego Masters in which teams from the Netherlands and Flanders compete to build the best constructions using Lego. The show returned in 2021 for its second season.

In 2022, he presented the television show Domino Challenge in which duos compete to create and topple the best  domino patterns. He also presents The Big Show met Ruben Nicolai, a television show similar to Michael McIntyre's Big Show hosted by British comedian Michael McIntyre.

Personal life 

Nicolai is father of two daughters.

References

External links 

 

1975 births
Living people
Dutch male comedians
Dutch game show hosts
People from Lanaken
21st-century Dutch people